Muriel Wace (1881–1968) was an English children's book author known by the pseudonym Golden Gorse.

Among her works was the popular Moorland Mousie (1929) (illustrated by Lionel Edwards), the story of an Exmoor Pony, believed to be strongly influenced by Anna Sewell's Black Beauty. Wace carefully maintained her anonymity, and did not allow her publishers to disseminate any biographical information about her. She wrote four fictional pony books, in addition to highly regarded instruction manuals.

Bibliography
 The Young Rider: Ponies for Health and Pleasure (non-fiction) (1928)
 Moorland Mousie (1929)
 Older Mousie (1932)
 The Young Rider’s Picture Book (non-fiction) (1936)
 Janet and Felicity, The Young Horsebreakers (1937)
 Mary in the Country (1955) (illustrated by E. H. Shepard)

References

External links
 Read more about the pony story in the interwar period

British children's writers
1881 births
1968 deaths
Pony books